Norway was represented by Ketil Stokkan, with the song "Brandenburger Tor", at the 1990 Eurovision Song Contest, which took place on 5 May in Zagreb. "Brandenburger Tor" was chosen as the Norwegian entry at the Melodi Grand Prix on 24 March. Stokkan had previously represented Norway in 1986.

Before Eurovision

Melodi Grand Prix 1990 
The MGP was held at the Hotel Royal Christiania in Oslo, hosted by Leif Erik Forberg. Ten songs took part with the winner chosen by voting from regional juries, an "expert" jury and a press jury. In the first round of voting the bottom five songs were eliminated, then the remaining five were voted on again to give the winner. Other participants included three-time Norwegian representative and MGP regular Jahn Teigen and Tor Endresen, who would represent Norway in 1997.

At Eurovision 
On the night of the final Stokkan performed 9th in the running order, following Iceland and preceding Israel. The song's subject matter was the fall of the Berlin Wall, and it was one of several songs in the contest with 'peace, hope and unity' lyrical content. At the close of voting "Brandenburger Tor" had received only 8 points, placing Norway joint last (with Finland) of the 22 entries. This was the seventh time Norway finished the evening at the bottom of the scoreboard. The Norwegian jury awarded its 12 points to France.

Voting

References

External links 
Full national final on nrk.no

1990
Countries in the Eurovision Song Contest 1990
1990
Eurovision
Eurovision